Émile Warré was a French priest and beekeeper who published several books and invented the Warré Hive, also known as the People’s Hive.

Biography
Éloi François Émile Warré was born on May 9, 1867 in Grébault-Mesnil and died on April 20, 1951 in Tours. He was ordained as a priest on September 19, 1891 in the Diocese of Amiens and became a parish priest in Mérélessart (Somme) in 1897 and then in Martainneville (Somme) in 1904.

Publications
He published several books based on his research:
 La santé ou les Meilleurs traitements de toutes les maladies
 Le Miel, ses propriétés et ses usages
 L’apiculture pour tous
 Le Secret de la santé, manuel des malades, des bien-portants et des gardes-malades

Warré hive
He is best known as the inventor of the People’s Hive. By 1948, Warré had been practicing beekeeping for over thirty years and had 350 hives in his apiary with a variety of models which he compared for over 15 years. After extensive research, he designed the People’s Hive. The goal was to create a hive that was as close to the natural conditions for the bees while remaining practical for the beekeeper. It was also designed to be built economically by anyone with simple tools and his book.

References

Links 
Italian Website on Warré Beehives

Beekeeping pioneers
French beekeepers
French Roman Catholic priests
1867 births
1951 deaths